Tulipa sprengeri, or Sprenger's tulip, is a wild tulip from the Pontic coast of Turkey. It is quite rare and possibly extinct in the wild, but widely cultivated as an ornamental.

Daniel Hall put it into the Kolpakowskiana group, later in the "solitary species". Wessel Marais placed it in section Tulipa because of its naked filament. Genetically, it seems to belong to the section Eriostemones, even if it does not have a hairy filament, normally seen as a defining characteristic, whereas glabrous filaments are typical of the Tulipa-group. It is diploid. The locus typicus is Amasya.

Identification and synonyms
The plant is easy to identify.
Synonyms:
T. brachyanthera Frey., described by Josef Franz Freyn in 1896 collected by J. J. Manissadjian in Amasya in 1894.

Description
The tunic of the bulb is papery, glabrous, chestnut-coloured and only slightly hairy near the stem. The five to six leaves are linear-lanceolate, channeled, bright green and up to 25 cm long. The stem is 20-30, sometimes up to 40 cm long. There is only one flower per bulb, the buds are upright and bright green.
The flower is bright red without a basal blotch. The obovate tepals are long and pointed, the oblong-elliptic outer tepals slightly shorter and light brown or yellowish on the outside, sometimes there is a green seam along the midrib, widening towards the tip. They are very narrow on the base, often leaving a gap. The flower itself is funnel-, later star-shaped. The filaments are glabrous, bright red at the top, pale yellow at base, 19–22 mm long, ca. 1 mm wide at tip, the swollen base is 3–4 mm wide. The anthers are yellow.
In England, it flowers in May and early June, the latest of the species tulips. The flowering time in the wild is unknown.

History
The plant was introduced to Europe by the German gardener Mühlendorff in 1892, who discovered it near Amasya. It is named after Carl Sprenger, a commercial gardener, who also published a description of the plant. The first scientific description was produced by J. Gilbert Baker in 1894 in The Gardeners' Chronicle. Mühlendorff sent bulbs to the nursery of Damman&Cie near Naples in Italy, which then supplied numerous bulbs to European gardeners between 1895 and 1898. The Armenian teacher J. J. Manissadijan from Merzifon supplied bulbs to the Dutch company Van Tubergen and John Hoog. He also sold other rare plants, like Iris gatesii to Dutch commercial gardeners. Obviously, too many bulbs were taken from the wild, and the plant became extinct. Later, he had to flee the country. The Englishman Edward Whittall from Izmir seems to have supplied Damman & Sprenger as well. No wild plants have been recorded since the First World War.

There are no descriptions of the wild habitat of the plant.
Sprenger's tulip is grown in over 30 Botanical gardens, among them Kew, Kopenhagen, Bonn and Edinburgh, it is also widely available from commercial nurseries. M. Rix believes that it may yet be rediscovered in the wild.

The Atatürk Arboretum in Istanbul has initiated a reintroduction project in co-operation with Kew Gardens. Genetic studies have shown that the tulips grown at Kew have retained a relatively wide genetic diversity. The story of the single misplaced bulb supplied by J. J. "Manissaadjian" to Van Tubergen  therefore seems spurious.

Cultivation
Sprenger's tulip is easy to grow. It can be naturalised. It also successfully self-seeds, the seeds need to be stratified. The plant needs only four years till flowering-stage. The plant needs a sunny but not too hot or semi-shady position. It should be planted 10–15 cm deep in well-drained, fairly fertile, humus-rich but not too dry soil. It may need protection from strong winds, but is frosthardy to - 10 °C, as long as the soil is not waterlogged or excessively wet. The plant tends to root very deeply and can thus be difficult to eradicate.
It received the RHS Award of Garden Merit in 1948  and 1993.

It rarely hybridizes because of the late flowering time. The bulbs dislike being disturbed and are difficult to move.
The plant suffers excessively from aphids.

References

Further reading
 Wilford R, Fay M. F. 2007. Tulipa sprengeri. Curtis’s Botanical Magazine 24, 211–216.

External links

sprengeri
Ephemeral plants
Flora of Turkey
IUCN Red List extinct in the wild species
Plants described in 1894